The Road' (Al Tarik) is a 2015 film by Lebanese director Rana Salem. Member of the main competition of the Moscow International Film Festival and Montreal World Film Festival.

Plot
Young couple Rana and Guy live in Beirut. Rana decides to get away from work but now doesn't know what to do with her life. Her husband, a man of purpose, cultivates the land while simultaneously being an independent video artist who creates live performances. Cut off from reality and having lost all sense of time and space, Rana plunges into memories and dreams. Guy decides they need to travel to help ease her mind. After leaving the city, they find themselves among untouched nature and abandoned villages. The travels bring to mind pictures of the past and eventually leads them home in the mountains where Guy spent his childhood.

Cast
 Rana Salem as Rana
 Guy Chartouni as Guy

References

External links

2015 films
2010s Arabic-language films
2015 drama films
Lebanese drama films
2010s road movies